Taebaek Line is a single-track electrified railway mainline connecting Jecheon station to Baeksan station in South Korea. At its two ends, the Taebaek Line connects to the Jungang Line and Yeongdong Line. The line was originally two spur lines, which were built across difficult mountainous terrain in stages, before a connection was built. The line includes the steepest section of the South Korean network, a short parallel line that is operated as a second track on the section includes South Korea's longest spiral tunnel. In passenger traffic, the line is served by cross-country passenger trains connecting the capital Seoul with Korea's east coast. In freight traffic, while coal transport declined, the line carries significant cement transport. In the winter, regular special trains take tourists along the scenic route.

History
This line was originally planned by the privately owned Chosen Railway as an extension of its Chungbuk Line; however, the end of Japanese rule in Korea led to this plan being abandoned for many years. In 1949, the Economic Cooperation Administration, the United States government agency administering the Marshall Plan, also launched a plan to revive South Korea's economy, which included the construction of new railway lines. One new line under the plan was a  line from Jecheon to the coal mines around Yeongwol and Hambaek to the east. Construction started in August 1949, but was interrupted by the Korean War in 1950, work resumed in October 1952.

Following the 1961 coup, the Supreme Council for National Reconstruction started South Korea's first five-year plan, which included a construction program to complete the railway network, to foster economic growth. One of the first lines completed under the plan was the Hwangji Branchline, which would later become the eastern end of the Taebaek Line. Another project under the five-year plan was a  railway between Yemi on the Hambaek Line and Jeongseon. The section climbing the mountains around Hambaek to Jeongsan (renamed Mindungsan in 2009), which would later become part of the Taebaek Line, was completed on December 19, 1966, and the entire railway from Jecheon to Jeongseon was renamed the Jeongseon Line, with the short Yemi–Hambaek branch retaining the Hambaek Line name. Also on December 19, 1966, a  branch from Jeongsan to Gohan opened as the Gohan Line, which would also become part of the future Taebaek Line. The Jeongseon Line was completed to Jeongseon on January 20, 1967; this section and its later extensions form the present-day Jeongseon Line.

Upgrade

The line was among the first foreseen for electrification with the 25 kV/60 Hz system in South Korea. Works started in 1972, already before the Taebaek Line was completed and officially renamed. The first trial run under the new voltage system in South Korea was conducted with a Class 8000 electric locomotive on the Jeongsan–Gohan section, then called the Gohan Line, on June 9, 1972. The rest of the line was electrified together with the section of the connecting Yeongdong Line until Donghae on the east coast, altogether , on December 5, 1975. At the same time, the Taebaek Triangle Line, a  connection built for trains from Jecheon to Donghae to run without reversal at Baeksan, was also put in service.

To improve traffic on the steep climb from Yemi to Jodong, the Hambaek Line was extended to Jodong to provide a second track. The electrification of altogether  around the Hambaek Line went into service on April 1, 1977.

The first  of the line from Jecheon to Ssangyong, which is nearing capacity with cement transport and mass transit, is being double-tracked for a higher capacity with a budget of 377.323 billion won, with a targeted opening in 2011.

Operation

In passenger traffic, the Taebaek Line is served by Mugunghwa-ho cross-country trains.  In the timetable valid from December 15, 2010, six pairs of daily trains run along the entire length of the line, reinforced by a seventh pair on Fridays to Sundays, with Jecheon–Taebaek travel times between 1 hour 49 minutes and 1 hour 58 minutes, depending on the number of stops.  These trains connect Cheongnyangni Station in the capital Seoul and Gangneung Station on Korea's east coast, using sections of the connecting Jungang and Yeongdong Lines to reach the Taebaek Line.  The Cheongnyangni–Taebaek travel time is between 3 hours 45 minutes and 4 hours 12 minutes, depending on the number of stops.  The Jecheon–Mindungsan section is also served by two pairs of daily trains running between Jecheon and Auraji on the Jeongseon Line.  On every 2nd, 7th, 12th, 17th, 22nd and 27th day of the month, one of these train pairs is extended to run between Cheongnyangni and Auraji as the "Jeongseon 5-Day Market Train", to transport passengers to and from the Jeongseon 5-Day Market.

In 1998, Korean National Railroad (today Korail) introduced special tourist trains operating in the winter months, identified by a snowflake decoration, which enjoyed great popularity.  Most of these trains also traverse the Taebaek Line.  By the 2009/2010 season, the offer expanded to a dozen different tour packages, including trips to single destinations combined with local excursions, as well as round trips in the Taebaek Mountains along the Jungang, Taebaek, Jeongseon and Yeongdong Lines.

According to Korail's plans in 2009, travel times on the Taebaek Line are to be reduced after 2013 with the future series version of the Tilting Train Express.

The line is also carries significant freight transport.  The line was originally built primarily to serve coal mines along it, but coal transport declined in the nineties when the government rationalised the coal industry and closed down mines in the region.  In the 2000s, cement transport from Ssangyong brings significant freight traffic to the line.

July 22, 2014, two passenger trains collided head-on between Taebaek and Mungok stations, killing one person and injuring 92 others. It was suspected that one of them missed a traffic signal. The accident occurred on a single-track railway and a tourist train was supposed to have temporarily stopped to let a commuter train leave.

Major stations
 Jecheon, the junction with the Jungang Line, regular passenger trains also connect the Chungbuk Line;
 Yeongwol;
 Yemi, the valley terminus of Hambaek Line;
 Jodong, the mountain terminus of Hambaek Line;
 Mindungsan (formerly Jeungsan), the terminus of Jeongseon Line;
 Sabuk;
 Gohan;
 Taebaek; and
 Baeksan, the junction with the Yeongdong Line.

References

Railway lines in South Korea